Nunnunarvu  is a 2016 Indian Tamil-language romantic thriller film written and directed by Mathivanan Sakthivel, who previously directed and starred in Maha Maha. The film features him and Indira in the lead roles. The music for the songs in the film is composed by Mayu Ganeshan with background score done by Raj and editing by Suresh Urs. The film released on 30 September 2016.

The film, predominantly shot in Australia, tells about a dentist trainee going there for his exam and experiencing unexplained feelings. The story centers around the consequences leading as a result of those feelings.

Plot
Chandru (Mathivanan Sakthivel) visits Sydney for his dental course exam. Charu (Indira), who is a psychology student, does research on telepathy. She learns the techniques to connect through telepathy. As a part of the technique, she tries to connect with Chandru, who fits with the character profile of a person that she wants to fall in love. During the process of connection through telepathy, both Chandru and Charu feels each other's feelings. Charu feels a hit that Chandru experiences during a robbery incident. Chandru feels a cut to his finger when Charu cuts her finger. They see each other's visions and hear each other's hearings. Eventually, they are able to see each other through a mirror. Their relationship starts as a friendship and then love.

Meanwhile, Chandru's friend Vinesh (R. Dinesh), murders a girl which is known only to Chandru. Vinesh now wants to kill Chandru. Charu's family friend Prasanth (Thiriloschenen Thiagarajah) abducts Charu out of lust. The climax is about how Chandru and Charu overcome their problems with Vinesh and Prasanth through telepathy.

Cast 
Most of the cast in the movie is newcomers, and they make their debuts in this film.

 Mathivanan Sakthivel as Chandru
 Indira as Charu
 R. Dinesh as Vinesh
 Thiriloschenen Thiagarajah as Prasanth
 Mandas Ramesh Jesudas as Charu's father
 Sefath as Paarvi
 Githa Vanan as Anitha
 Uma as Dentist
 Sujan Selven as Vinesh's friend
 Jay Kallaway as Ian Shorten
 Emma Monk as Jenny
 Bianca Moon as Camp Girl
 Shaun Anthony Robinson as Thief

Production 
The film is produced by Sakthi Screens, written and directed by Mathivanan Sakthivel.

The film's title, Nunnunarvu, is unusual and not commonly used in Tamil.

Music 
The film has five song tracks composed by Mayu Ganeshan. and lyrics by Mathivanan Sakthivel. Background score is done by Raj.

Release 
The film was released on 30 September 2016 in India. In Australia, the film was released on 1 October 2016 and 2 October 2016 in the United Kingdom.

Critical reception 

Dinamalar review quoted that the concept of telepathy in "Nunnunarvu" movie is new to Tamil cinema and that the movie is different and fast-paced. Mathivanan Sakthivel has perfectly fit the character of Chandru in the film. The scenes where the Chandru and Charu characters connect for the first time through telepathy and scenes where both feel the feelings of each other are interesting scenes in the film. The editing by Suresh Urs is fault less and the cinematography is good. The villain characters played by Dinesh and Thiri and the character Anitha are good. The melody songs composed by Mayu Ganehsan are pleasing. The scenes where the Charu character is abducted doesn't look new and these type of scenes are common in Tamil cinema. In summary the film "Nunnunarvu"is new concept to Tamil cinema.

Maalai Malar quoted that Nunnuarvu's concept of telepathy is excellent. While the director has chosen a story that is suitable for many artists, more attention could have been given to the casting for this film. Mathivanan Sakthivel has improved his acting from his first film Maha Maha. While artists doesn't look like professional actors, they have done a good job. Mayu Ganeshan's songs are ok to hear and background score needs improving.

"NETTV4u" mentioned that the concept of the movie was engaging and different. The film did not have unnecessary sequences. The film has couple of flaws but welcomes the movie for its fresh concept. "The Times of India - Samayam" referred the film as having a fresh concept with Mathivanan Sakthivel, and Indira acting matched the role. "IFlicks" mentioned that the story of the film is unique but lacks effective casting.

Awards 

Nunnunarvu won the "Award of Recognition" from  "The IndieFEST Film Awards" in May 2019. 

In 2020, Mathivanan Sakthivel received the Best Writer award at the Indo-Global International Film Festival and Nunnunarvu also received the Special Jury Award at this Festival.

In 2021, Nunnunarvu was officially selected for the Mumbai International Film Awards and Mathivanan Sakthivel won Best Screenplay Award for Nunnunarvu.

Other-language version 

Nunnunarvu was dubbed as Panchathantralu in Telugu. The Telugu version of the movie was released in December 2018.

References

External links

 https://www.facebook.com/NunnUnarvu-1131793343500245/
 
 

2016 films
2010s Tamil-language films
Indian thriller drama films
2016 romantic drama films
Indian romantic drama films
Tamil-language psychological thriller films
2016 psychological thriller films
Indian multilingual films
Films shot in Australia
Films shot in Sydney
Films shot in Chennai